The Bernese March (German Berner Marsch; French La Marche de Berne) is the traditional anthem of the Swiss Canton of Bern and is played at official occasions.

The march is of uncertain date; originally sung by Bernese mercenaries, it was adopted as the anthem of the Bernese Republic. It is now normally performed in the instrumental version, because the Bernese German lyrics are not widely known and no French lyrics exist.

Lyrics 
The following is the most frequently reproduced version of the traditional Bernese German lyrics, complemented with a Standard German and English translation by the authors of this article.

An older variant of the text replaces "Stark und frey in Not und G'fahre" in the first stanza with "Die, wo z'Fuess und z'Sattel fahre" ("Those on foot and those in the saddle").

External links
 Bernese March as a Real Audio File
 WMA-version (MediaPlayer)

Regional songs
European anthems
Canton of Bern